Hamilton Township is one of the seventeen townships of Franklin County, Ohio, United States.  The 2010 census found 8,260 people in the township, 4,438 of whom lived in the unincorporated portions of the township.

Geography
Located in the southern part of the county, it has the following borders:
Columbus - north
Madison Township - east
Madison Township, Pickaway County - southeast corner
Harrison Township, Pickaway County - south
Scioto Township, Pickaway County - southwest
Jackson Township - west

Most of northern and western Hamilton Township is occupied by the city of Columbus, the county seat of Franklin County.  The villages of Lockbourne and Obetz are located in the southern and northeastern part of the township respectively. Near the southeast corner of the township lies Rickenbacker Air National Guard Base.

Government
The township is governed by a three-member board of trustees, who are elected in November of odd-numbered years to a four-year term beginning on the following January 1. Two are elected in the year after the presidential election and one is elected in the year before it. There is also an elected township fiscal officer, who serves a four-year term beginning on April 1 of the year after the election, which is held in November of the year before the presidential election. Vacancies in the fiscal officership or on the board of trustees are filled by the remaining trustees.

Landmarks
 Scioto Downs, located on U.S. Route 23, is a horse racing track and the site of the OHSAA State Cross Country Championships.

Gallery

References

External links
http://www.hamiltontownshipohio.org/
County website

Townships in Franklin County, Ohio
Townships in Ohio